William Embre Gaines (August 30, 1844 – May 4, 1912) was a U.S. Representative from Virginia.

Biography

Born near Charlotte Court House, Virginia, Gaines attended local public school. During the Civil War, he enlisted as a private in Company K of the 18th Virginia Regiment (Pickett's division). He reenlisted and joined the Army of the Cape Fear, which surrendered with General Joe Johnston near Greensboro, North Carolina, in April 1865. He attained the rank of adjutant in Manly's artillery battalion.

After the war, Gaines studied law, was admitted to the bar, and practiced in Burkeville, Virginia. He also engaged in the tobacco business and in banking. He was elected to the Senate of Virginia and served from 1883 to 1887, when he resigned. He served as delegate to the Republican National Convention in 1884, and later was mayor of Burkeville.  He also was a delegate to several state Republican conventions.

Gaines was elected as a Republican to the 50th United States Congress (March 4, 1887 – March 3, 1889). He was not a candidate for renomination in 1888.

He died in Washington, D.C., on May 4, 1912, and was interred in Glenwood Cemetery.

Electoral history
1886 - Gaines was elected to the U.S. House of Representatives with 70.24% of the vote, defeating Democrat Mann Page.

References

Bibliography

1844 births
1912 deaths
Virginia lawyers
Republican Party Virginia state senators
Confederate States Army officers
Burials at Glenwood Cemetery (Washington, D.C.)
Republican Party members of the United States House of Representatives from Virginia
People from Charlotte County, Virginia
People from Burkeville, Virginia
19th-century American politicians
Mayors of places in Virginia
19th-century American lawyers